The Australian Healthcare and Hospitals Association is the representative body for the public hospital sector in Australia.  It is one of 23 bodies funded from the government's Health Peaks and Advisory Bodies Program.

The Deeble Institute for Health Policy Research is its research arm.   Alison Verhoeven is the Chief Executive.

It demanded more effective leadership of the healthcare sector and better-coordinated government reform initiatives in May 2019. In particular it demanded reversal of the “massive” cuts to adult public dental services and fluoridation of the water supply.  The association calls for an independent national health authority, which is distinct from the existing state and territory health departments and could tackle entrenched problems and support integrated care.

In June 2019 it denied claims by Scott Morrison that the admission of refugees would disadvantage Australians in their access to hospital care. 

It makes an annual award, the Sidney Sax medal, to an individual who has made an outstanding contribution in the field of health services policy, organisation, delivery and research.

It publishes a monthly peer-reviewed journal, the Australian Health Review.

References

Medical and health organisations based in Australia